The Cathedral Basilica of the Immaculate Conception or Metropolitan Cathedral of Mérida is a religious building of the Roman Catholic church located in the city of Mérida in western Venezuela, in the state of the same name, part of the Andean region in that country.

It is the seat of the Archdiocese of Mérida. It was built from 1805 with various modifications until 1960. It has numerous stained glass and religious objects of great historical value.

It was built near the Plaza Bolivar in Mérida and the Archbishop's Palace and Archdiocesan Museum.

See also
Roman Catholicism in Venezuela

References

Roman Catholic cathedrals in Venezuela
19th-century Roman Catholic church buildings in Venezuela
19th-century establishments in the Spanish Empire
Basilica churches in Venezuela